The Bukidnon–Davao Road, often called as BuDa Road (a syllabic abbreviation of Bukidnon and Davao) and also known as Bukidnon–Davao City Road, is a , two-to-four lane national primary highway that connects Davao City and the municipality of Maramag in Bukidnon.

The entire road forms part of National Route 10 (N10) of the Philippine highway network and a spur of Asian Highway 26 (AH26) of the Asian highway network.

References 

Roads in Bukidnon
Roads in Cotabato
Roads in Davao del Sur
Davao City